Llandudno Lifeboat Station is located in the North Wales town of Llandudno. It was the only lifeboat station in the UK to have its boathouse located in the middle of town. Whereas most lifeboat stations are situated next to the sea for obvious reasons, Llandudno Lifeboat Station was situated in Lloyd Street, almost equidistant from both of Llandudno's shores.  The reason for the unique situation of Llandudno Lifeboat goes back to 1861 when the boathouse was positioned so that it could be towed equally quickly to either of Llandudno's main shores. The boathouse was constructed in 1903.In order to accommodate the new Shannon-class lifeboat, a new boathouse was built on the south end of the promenade at Craig-y-Don. The new lifeboat "William F. Yates" (ON1325) arrived at its new home on 24 September 2017.

History 
Originally called 'Ormes Head' lifeboat, the lifeboat was designed to look after the busy shipping area close to the Great Orme used by the many ships to ferry goods to the enormous Mersyside docks and other North Western destinations.  The Great Orme with its shallow waters, strong tides, rocky coastline and often strong winds, claimed many ships and lives.  Because of the weather and tidal conditions, plus the depths of water, vicious waves can quickly build up around the Orme and Liverpool Bay.

More recently, Llandudno lifeboat has undertaken some famous and unusual rescues.  One mammoth 18-hour rescue in gale force winds in 2008 saw the lifeboat, under the command of Coxswain Graham Heritage, going 34 miles offshore to rescue a couple in distress whose boat had become anchored to the sea bed by fishing nets. Crew member Tim James was put aboard and spent an hour and a half, frequently submerged by waves, freeing the boat from the nets.  As a result of their service that year The Crew were awarded the North Wales 'Your Champions' 2008 team award and Tim James received the top award 'Champion of Champions'.  A couple of years earlier, the inshore boat was launched to the aid of a humpback whale that had become tangled in ropes and a buoy off Rhos-on-Sea. The whale was successfully cut free probably saving its life.

The Llandudno inshore lifeboat serves the immediate coastline of the Great Orme, Little Orme, Rhos-on-Sea, Colwyn Bay and Llandudno West Shore.  On the West Shore there are dangerous sands, widely used by families visiting the seaside, that can quickly become flooded trapping people on the sand bars as the tide floods.  Sadly these sands have caused tragedy in recent years and it is for this reason that the Llandudno Inshore Lifeboat, along with Conwy Inshore Lifeboat, are on 24-hour call for an immediate launch.

In 2011, Dan Jones, a former Llandudno Lifeboat RNLI coxswain was awarded an MBE for his dedication to the service.

New lifeboat station

Local residents around the existing lifeboat station complained of shaking every time a launch was undertaken.

Llandudno was scheduled to gain a new Shannon class lifeboat in 2015, but the existing lifeboat station was too small to house it. In previous years, a number of attempts had been made to relocate the lifeboat station without success, due to planning complaints raised by local hoteliers who do not want a lifeboat station interrupting the view in front of their hotel. Construction of a new boathouse finally began in the spring of 2016 and was completed in the summer of 2017. The new Shannon class boat arrived at the new station on September 24, 2017.

Fleet

All Weather lifeboats

Inshore lifeboats

References

External links
 Llandudno Lifeboat Station official website
 Archive footage of the Llandudno lifeboat from 1926

Lifeboat stations in Wales
Llandudno
Transport infrastructure completed in 1861
1861 establishments in Wales